C. colombiana  may refer to:

 Carollia colombiana, the Colombian Short-tailed Bat
 Cryptotis colombiana, the Colombian small-eared shrew

See also 
 Colombiana (disambiguation)